is a Japanese international rugby union player who plays in the flanker position.

Early / Provincial Career

Kin has played all of his senior club rugby in Japan with the NTT Shining Arcs who he joined in 2014.

Super Rugby career

He was selected as a member of the first ever Sunwolves squad ahead of the 2016 Super Rugby season.   He played in two matches during their debut campaign.

International

Kin made his senior international debut in a match against Hong Kong on 7 May 2016 where he also scored is first try for his country.   He was also selected for all three of Japan's matches during the 2016 mid-year rugby union internationals, featuring as a replacement against  in Vancouver and starting both tests in the home series against .

Super Rugby Statistics

References

1991 births
Living people
Japan international rugby union players
Urayasu D-Rocks players
People from Hirakata
Rugby union flankers
South Korean expatriate sportspeople
South Korean rugby union players
Sunwolves players
Waseda University alumni
Waseda University Rugby Football Club players
Zainichi Korean people